S. aureus  may refer to:
 Scleropages aureus, a proposed species of the Asian arowana, a fish species native to Southeast Asia
 Senecio aureus, the golden ragwort, a perennial flowering plant species native to eastern North America
 Sericulus aureus, the flame bowerbird, a bird species endemic to rainforests of New Guinea
 Somatogyrus aureus, the golden pebblesnail, a minute freshwater snail species endemic to the United States
 Staphylococcus aureus, a facultatively anaerobic, Gram-positive coccus species and the most common cause of staph infections

See also
 Aureus (disambiguation)